Alexis Carra (born 27 April 1990) is a French footballer who plays as a striker.

References 

1990 births
Living people
French footballers
French expatriate footballers
Association football forwards
Olympique Lyonnais players
Serie B players
L.R. Vicenza players
A.S. Cittadella players
Expatriate footballers in Italy
Sportspeople from Villefranche-sur-Saône
French expatriate sportspeople in Italy
Footballers from Auvergne-Rhône-Alpes